The Provisional Administration of the Front-line and Phase Territories was a civil authority of the territories controlled by Second Polish Republic but not incorporated into the state itself, that was formed during the Polish–Soviet War in 1920. It was formed on 9 September 1920 replacing Civil Administration of the Eastern Lands and Civil Administration of the Lands of Volhynia and Podolian Front. On 20 December 1920, it was disestablished and its territories incorporated into Poland.

History 
Provisional Administration of Front-line and Phase Territories was established by Second Polish Republic on 9 September 1920, as a civil authority of the territories controlled but not incorporated into the state itself. The order to form it was given by the Commander-in-chief of the Polish Armed Forces. It was formed from Civil Administration of the Eastern Lands and Civil Administration of the Lands of Volhynia and Podolian Front. The territory was ruled by the Chief Commissioner Władysław Raczkiewicz. It was disestablished on 20 December 1920 by the decision of Council of Ministers from 27 November 1920. Its lands were incorporated into Poland.

Notes

References

Bibliography 
 Waldemar Kozyra. Polityka administracyjna władz polskich na Ziemiach Wschodnich Rzeczypospolitej Polskiej w latach 1918–1926. Białystok. 2005.

Civil administrations of the Second Polish Republic
Western Belorussia (1918–1939)
History of Volhynia
Polish–Soviet War
States and territories established in 1920
States and territories disestablished in 1920
1920 establishments in Poland
1920 establishments in Lithuania
1920 establishments in Belarus
1920 establishments in Ukraine
1920 disestablishments in Poland
1920 disestablishments in Lithuania
1920 disestablishments in Ukraine